The 2021 South Korean Figure Skating Championships were held from February 24–26, 2021 at the Uijeongbu Indoor Ice Rink in Uijeongbu. It was the 75th edition of the event. Medals were awarded in the disciplines of men's and ladies' singles on the senior and junior levels. The results were part of the Korean selection criteria for the 2021 World Championships.

The event was originally scheduled to be held from January 8–10, 2021 in Seoul, before being postponed in December 2020 due to the COVID-19 pandemic in South Korea. It was later rescheduled and relocated. No audience was allowed to attend the event.

Medal summary

Senior

Junior

Senior results

Senior men

Senior ladies

Senior ice dance 
Yura Min / Daniel Eaton, the only Korean ice dance team, did not travel to Korea from their Novi, Michigan, United States training base.

Junior results

Junior men

Junior ladies 
Bae Min-ji withdrew prior to the event.

International team selections

World Championships 
The World Championships are scheduled to be held from March 22–28 in Stockholm, Sweden. The team was reported on February 26, 2021.

Four Continents Championships 
The 2021 Four Continents Championships were scheduled from February 9–14 in Sydney, Australia, but were cancelled on October 16.

World Junior Championships 
The 2021 World Junior Championships were scheduled from March 1–7 in Harbin, China, but were cancelled on November 24.

References

External links 
 

South Korean Figure Skating Championships
South Korean Figure Skating Championships, 2021
Figure skating
February 2021 sports events in South Korea